This is a list of notable companies in Israel.

A

 Adallom
 AdExtent
 Aeronautics Defense Systems
 Africa Israel Investments
 Ahava
 Aladdin Knowledge Systems
 Allot Communications
 Alvarion
 Am Oved
 Amdocs
 Amit, Pollak, Matalon & Co.
 Anobit – acquired by Apple Inc. in 2012
 Answers Corporation
 Any.do
 Arava Power Company
 Aroma Espresso Bar
 AudioCodes
 Automotive Industries
 Azrieli Group

B

 Babylon
 Balter, Guth, Aloni & Co.
 Bank Hapoalim
 Bank Leumi
 Bank Mizrahi-Tefahot
 Bank Otsar Ha-Hayal
 Barkan Mounts
 Better Place
 Bezeq
 BigBand Networks
 BioLineRx
 Brainsway
 BUL Transmark
 Burgeranch

C
 Caesarstone Sdot-Yam
 Café Café
 Café Hillel
 CAL Cargo Air Lines
 Carmel Agrexco
 Castro Model
 Cellcom Israel
 Ceragon Networks
 Check Point Software Technologies
 Cimatron
 Clalit Health Services Group
 ClickSoftware Technologies
 Cofix
 Collactive
 Compugen
 Comverse Technology
 Conduit
 CTERA Networks
 Cyber-Ark

D
 D.B.S. Satellite Services (Yes)
 Dan Company for Public Transportation
 dbMotion
 Delek Group
 Discount Investment Corporation
 Dori Media Group

E
 ECI Telecom
 Egged Bus Cooperative
 Eilat Ashkelon Pipeline Company
 El Al Israel Airlines
 Elbit Systems
 Elco Holdings
 Elisra
 Elta
 Enlight Renewable Energy
 eToro
 Exanet
 Expand Networks

F
 Fermentek
 First International Bank of Israel
 Fischer, Behar, Chen, Well, Orion & Co.
 Fiverr
 Fox–Wizel
 Freescale Semiconductor
 Frutarom

G

 Gilat Satellite Networks
 Given Imaging
 Globes
 Golan Heights Winery
 Golan Telecom
 Goldfarb, Levy, Eran, Meiri & Co.
 Gornitzky & Co.
 GreenSun Energy
 Gross, Kleinhendler, Hodak, Halevy, Greenberg & Co.

H
 Haaretz
 Hamashbir Lazarchan
 Hatehof
 Herzog, Fox & Neeman
 Honigman & Sons
 Hot
 HP Indigo
 HP Scitex

I

 IBM Israel
 Imi Tami Institute for Research and Development
 Insightec
 IronSource
 ISCAR Metalworking
 Israel Aerospace Industries (IAI)
 Israel Chemicals
 Israel Corporation
 Israel Diamond Exchange
 Israel Discount Bank
 Israel Electric Corporation
 Israel Military Industries (IMI)
 Israel Railways
 Israel Shipyards
 Israel Weapon Industries (IWI)
 Israir
 Issta

J
 
 Jacada
 Jerusalem Post

K
 Kampyle
 Kanaf Arkia
 Kavim
 KCPS Clarity
 Keter Plastic
 Kramer Electronics

L
Leaf 
Lili Diamonds

M

 M. Firon & Co. Advocates & Notaries
 M-Systems - acquired by SanDisk in 2006
 Maariv
 Magic Software Enterprises
 Makhteshim Agan
 Mano Maritime
 Mapa
 The Marker
 Maskit
 Max Brenner
 Mer Group
 Mercury Interactive
 Metacafe
 Metrodan Beersheba
 Metropoline
 Mey Eden
 Migdal Insurance and Financial Holdings
 Mind CTI
 MindCite
 Mirabilis
 Mirs Communications
 Mobileye
 Mobilitec
 monday.com
 Moovit
 Motorola Israel
 MyHeritage

N
 Namogoo 
 Naot
 Nativ Express
 NDS Technologies Israel
 Ness Technologies
 Netafim
 NetManage
 Newlog (a subsidiary of shipping magnate Zim)
 NICE Systems
 Nilit
 NMC Music

O

 Objet Geometries
 Ofer Brothers Group
 Orbotech
 Ormat Industries
 Osem
 OverOps

P
 Panorama Software
 Partner Communications Company
 Paz Oil Company
 Pelephone
 Perion Network
 Perrigo
 Phinergy
 Plasan
 PrimeSense – acquired by Apple Inc. in 2013
 Protalix BioTherapeutics
 Psagot Investment House

R

 RAD Data Communications
 Rad Group
 Radcom
 Radvision
 Radware
 RADWIN
 RAFAEL Armament Development Authority
 Rami Levy Hashikma Marketing
 Retalix
 Rimon Winery
 Riskified
 Rounds

S
 S. Horowitz & Co.
 Sano
 Scailex Corporation
 Secret Double Octopus
 Shopping.com
 Shufersal
 SimiGon
 SodaStream
 SolarEdge
 Solel
 Soltam
 Sonol
 Source Vagabond Systems
 Spacecom
 Steimatzky
 Sephora
 StoreDot
 Strauss-Elite
 Sun D'Or
 Superbus
 SuperPharm

T

 Tadiran
 Tadiran Telecom
 Takipi
 Tamir Airways
 Tara
 Taro Pharmaceuticals
 Tawkon
 Taykey
 Tecnomatix
 Tel Aviv Stock Exchange
 ThetaRay
 Tempo Beer Industries
 Teva Naot
 Teva Pharmaceutical Industries
 Tnuva

V
 Verint Systems
 Viber
 Vigilant Technology
 VocalTec

W
 Walla!
 Waze
 Wix.com

Y
 Yedioth Ahronoth
 Yehuda Matzos
 Yigal Arnon & Co.
 YVEL

Z
 Zemingo Group
 Zend Technologies
 Zenith Solar
 Zim Integrated Shipping Services
 Zoran Corporation

See also 

 Economy of Israel
 Tel Aviv Stock Exchange
 List of largest companies in Israel
 List of Israeli companies quoted on the Nasdaq
 List of Israeli companies quoted on the ASX
 List of restaurants in Israel
 TA-100 Index

References 

 
Israel